The Wenatchi people or Šnp̍əšqʷáw̉šəxʷi / Np̓əšqʷáw̓səxʷ ("People in the between") are Native Americans who originally lived near the confluence of the Columbia and Wenatchee Rivers in Central Washington state. They spoke Interior Salish (a variant of Salish) and ate salmon, starchy roots like camas and biscuitroot, berries, deer, sheep and whatever else they could hunt or catch. The river that they lived on, the Wenatchee River, had one of the greatest runs of salmon in the world prior to numerous hydroelectric dams being put in on the downstream Columbia, pollution and other issues, and was their main food source.

History

The tribal name "Wenatchi" is of Yakama-Sahaptin origin, the neighboring Yakama named the "Wenatchapam Fishery" Winátsha and the particular Wenatchi Band at this place Winátshapam ("People at Winátsha"), the Wenatchi called this Band Sinpusqôisoh. Therefore they were called in historic times also "P'squosa/Pisquouse". The individually distinct Wenatchi bands, are the following: 
the Stsilámuh ("People at the Deep Water, i.e. Lake Chelan") at the outlet of Lake Chelan (Tsilán - "Deep Water")
the Sintiátqkumuh ("People from the place of grassy water") along Entiat River (Ntiátq/Nt'yátkw/Nt'iátkw - "place of grassy water")
the Siniálkumuh on the Columbia between Entiat River and Wenatchee River
the Sinkumchímulh ("People at the mouth of [Wenatchee] River") at the mouth of the Wenatchee;
the Sinhahamchímuh higher up on the Wenatchee; and 
the Sinpusqôisoh (already mentioned) at the forks of the Wenatchee, where the town of Leavenworth, Washington, now stands. 

They were closely related by language with the Entiat and Chelan peoples and through marriage and culture with Upper Yakima bands.  

Sometimes the Chelan (Ščəl̕ámxəxʷ - "People at the Deep Water, i.e. Lake Chelan") and Entiat were considered simply as another Wenatchi Bands; the Entiat (also known as: Inti-etook, Intietooks) - which called themselves Šntiyátkʷəxʷ (Sintia'tkumuk/Sintiatqkumuh) ("People from the place of grassy water/Gras in Water, i.e. Entiat River") and the Sinialkumuh Band of Entiat were often classed as "Wenatchi" or "P'squosa". Moreover, the Chelan people also described themselves as Šntiyátkʷəxʷ ("People from the place of grassy water/Gras in Water, i.e. Entiat River"). 

The Wenatchi tribe was far more isolated prior to the arrival of the horse, but afterward they adopted many of the traditions and style of dress of the Plains Indians and were closely allied with the Spokane tribes by the time white settlers arrived. It is also estimated that 90% of the indigenous population died prior to white contact, infectious diseases spreading with the horse far in advance.

The Wenatchis (or "P'squosa") were not given reservation land by the federal government—though they had actually signed a treaty, it was never recognized, and fell by the wayside as new settlers moved into their territory. The Wenatchi Indians unlike many other tribes did not engage in war with the new arrivals and were even friends with the first white settlers and their families. Janie Hollingsworth, an early settler born in 1911, remembers fondly growing up with the daughter of the Wenatchi Chief in the Nahahum Canyon area, riding horses together happily until the government decided to round up all the Indians and put them in existing reservations. Subsequently, most modern day Wenatchis are found living on the Colville Indian Reservation, with a small number living on the Yakama Reservation.

Wenatchapam Fishery 
The Wenatchapam Fishery is an important cultural site for the Wenatchi people. The land is currently incorporated into Wenatchee National Forest at the confluence of the Wenatchee River and Icicle Creek near Leavenworth. The fishery was named as a reservation site in the Yakama treaty from the Walla Walla Council (1855), and the boundaries were surveyed and designated by Army personnel in subsequent years. Following the establishment and reallocation of lands of the Colville Indian Reservation, Wenatchi Chief John Harmelt was supported by Chief Joseph of the Nez Perce people in lobbying for federal protection of Wenatchi rights to the fishery. More white settlers moved to the area, infringing on the Wenatchi's claim to the land, and the Great Northern Railway was approved to build a route through the reserved land.

Another survey was commissioned in 1893, but federal agent L.T. Erwin, who was aligned with the settlers and railroad company, intervened in the process. He attempted to offer Chief Harmelt individual allotments in the mountains to the remaining Wenatchi people, however Harmelt insisted on consulting with his people before entering into a decision. In his absence, Erwin told the Yakama tribal leaders that the Wenatchi had sold their land rights, and the Yakama sold their share for $20,000.

References

Further reading

 Chalfant, Stuart A. Ethnohistorical Reports on Aboriginal Land Use and Occupancy: Spokan Indians, Palus Indians, Columbia Salish, Wenatchi Salish. Interior Salish and eastern Washington Indians, 4. New York: Garland Pub. Inc, 1974. 
 Gardner, Grace Christiansen. Life Among North Central Washington First Families - the Red Men. [Wenatchee: The Daily World, 1935.
 Marshall, Maureen E. Wenatchee's Dark Past. Wenatchee, Wash: The Wenatchee World, 2008.
 Scheuerman, Richard D. The Wenatchi Indians: Guardians of the Valley. Fairfield, Wash: Ye Galleon Press, 1982. 
 Scheuerman, Richard D., John Clement, and Clifford E. Trafzer. The Wenatchee Valley and Its First Peoples: Thrilling Grandeur, Unfulfilled Promise. Wenatchee, Wash: Wenatchee Valley Museum & Cultural Center, 2005. 
 Smythe, Charles W., and Priya Helweg. Summary of Ethnological Objects in the National Museum of Natural History Associated with the Wenatchi Culture. Washington, D.C.: Repatriation Office, National Museum of Natural History, Smithsonian Institution, 1996.

External links
 False Promises: The Story of the Wenatchi Indians
 E. Richard Hart papers, 1664-2014

Native American tribes in Washington (state)
Interior Salish
Indigenous peoples of the Northwest Plateau